The Congregation of the Priests of Mercy, commonly called Fathers of Mercy is a Catholic clerical religious congregation of Pontifical Right for men (missionary priests) founded by Jean-Baptiste Rauzan in early 19th-century France. Its members add the nominal letters C.P.M. after their names to indicate their membership in the Congregation.

History

Foundation 

The founder, Jean-Baptiste Rauzan, was born at Bordeaux on 5 December 1757. After completing his ecclesiastical studies, he taught theology and sacred eloquence and later was chosen Vicar-General of Bordeaux where he inaugurated a missionary movement. The institute was established at Lyon, France, in 1808.

After preaching in the Diocese of Troyes the institute received from the Government of Emperor Napoleon I, unsolicited subsidies to defray the expenses of their missions. However, following Napoleon's dispute with Pope Pius VII, the society, called the Missionaries of France, was suppressed.

In 1814, at the suggestion of Cardinal Fesch, a Generalate for the community was established in Paris where the fathers were placed in charge of several parishes. Father Rauzan and his colleagues, were joined by the young Vicar-General of Chambéry, de Forbin-Janson, afterwards Bishop of Nancy; Denis-Luc Frayssinous, who founded St. Stanislaus College and instructed the young missionaries in sacred eloquence; Legris Duval, the St. Vincent de Paul of his day, Le Vasseur, Armand-Benjamin Caillau and Carboy.

They evangelized the French cities of Orléans, Poitiers, Tours, Rennes, Marseilles, Toulon, Paris and other places, and established the Works of St. Geneviève and the Association of the Ladies of Providence in many parts of France. Rauzan founded the Congregation of the Sisters of St. Clotilde for the education of young ladies. The royal family assisted him financially and gave him Mount Valerian, at that time the center of piety, and later one of the principal forts protecting the capital.

In 1830, during the second Revolution, the Missionaries of France were dispersed and exiled and their house in Paris sacked. Rauzan went to Rome, where he was received by Pope Gregory XVI, who authorized him to found a new society, to be known as the Society of the Fathers of Mercy (S.P.M.). The Papal Brief of approbation, which also contains the constitutions, was given 18 February 1834, and on 15 March of the same year a second Brief, affiliating the new society to the Propaganda Fide, and the former Missionaries of France accepted these constitutions on 8 December 1835. Rauzan died in Paris, 5 September 1847.

Its members included Mgsr Faillet, Bishop of Orléans, Mgsr. Alfred Duquesnay, Archbishop of Cambrai; Victor-Felix Bernadou, Archbishop of Sens, who later became a cardinal. The Fathers of Mercy resumed their missionary activities in France, but all religious societies were subject to the decree of expulsion in 1880. However, through the influence of their many friends in Paris, and claiming the enforcement of the authorization given to the society by the restored Bourbon king Louis XVIII in 1816, the Fathers of Mercy retained their mother-house in Paris until the separation of the Church and State in 1905, when they moved to Belgium.

America 
In 1839, at the suggestion of Bishop Hughes of New York, Mgr. Forbin-Janson introduced the Fathers of Mercy into the United States, initially in the Diocese of New Orleans. Fr. Ferdinand Bach, the first superior in America, became the Rector of the Cathedral of St. Louis in New Orleans where he died tending victims of yellow fever. (Correspondence between Bach and the motherhouse in Paris is on file in the archives of the University of Notre Dame.)

Bishop Potiers of Mobile, Alabama, then invited them to take charge of Spring Hill College. Two years later, Fathers Lafont and Aubril were sent to look after the increasing French population in New York City, where the Fathers of Mercy took charge of the parishes of St. Vincent de Paul, Manhattan, and of Our Lady of Lourdes and St. Frances de Chantal, Brooklyn. They also  set up houses of studies in Rome, Belgium, France and other places. By a decree of Propaganda in August 1906, Theophile Wucher was named Vicar General of the Institute for three years and took up residence in New York.

The Fathers of Mercy staffed St. John the Evangelist Parish in Green Bay from 1888 to 1891. They returned to Green Bay in 2011 to staff the National Shrine of Our Lady of Good Help.

Present day 
The Generalate is in Auburn, Kentucky; St. Joseph's Novitiate is located in South Union. Novices attend classes at Mount St. Mary's Seminary in Cincinnati. The habit of the congregation is the black Roman cassock.

Their primary apostolate is preaching parish missions and conducting retreats throughout the United States, Canada and Australia. They are active in the Archdiocese of Louisville and the dioceses of Green Bay and Owensboro.

They staff a couple of small, rural parishes in the Archdiocese of Louisville. "The Fathers of Mercy Hour" is broadcast on a number of Catholic radio outlets. Retreat conferences are made available on CDs.

The Community Chapel of Divine Mercy 

In the spring of 2006 the Fathers of Mercy began construction of the Chapel of Divine Mercy.  This chapel took over 2 years to complete construction and in August 2008 was consecrated, by the Most Rev. John Jeremiah McRaith, and opened to the public.

Events 
Several events are held annually at the Fathers of Mercy Generalate and the Chapel of Divine Mercy.  These include the Divine Mercy celebration, the Corpus Christi procession, and the celebrations of vows and Ordinations.

Charism 
The Fathers of Mercy define their charism as:
Purpose:  We are entirely ordered to the apostolate, with our primary focus on the Spiritual Works of Mercy. This apostolate may be undertaken among those without the true Faith or among the faithful living in rural or neglected areas. The primary apostolate of the Fathers of Mercy is the preaching of parish missions and retreats; we also assist bishops with the staffing of rural parishes.

Missionary Spirit: Our work emphasizes the Mercy of God: Our venerable founder, Father Jean Baptiste Rauzan, provided us with the "Father of the Prodigal Son" as our model, as well as the scripture verse: "He was moved with mercy" (cf. Luke 15:20) as our motto.

Devotion to the Blessed Virgin Mary: Our specific form of devotion is to the Immaculate Conception, because we were placed under this title of Our Lady by Pope Gregory XVI when he approved our Congregation in 1834, some twenty years before Pope Pius IX defined the dogma in 1854. We recite five decades of the rosary every day and celebrate the Memorial of Our Lady of the Rosary on October 7th with great solemnity.

Seeking the protection of the Blessed Mother: We end all our spiritual exercises with the ancient prayer Sub tuum praesidium:

We fly unto thy patronage, O Holy Mother of God.Despise not our petitions in our necessities, but deliver us from all dangers,O Ever Glorious and Blessed Virgin.

Consecration to the Blessed Virgin Mary: Our members consecrate themselves to the Blessed Virgin Mary every year on the Solemnity of the Immaculate Conception, December 8th. We have a yearly novena to our Lady under this title, and this is a solemnity proper to our Congregation. The original Constitutions drawn up by Father Rauzan affirmed the belief that one goes surely to Jesus through Mary. Placing ourselves under the patronage of the Blessed Virgin Mary, we profess our Final/Perpetual Vows on August 15th, the Solemnity of the Assumption of the Blessed Virgin Mary, and we try to schedule all of our Ordinations on a Marian feast day.

Distinctive habit: Our habit, given to us by our Founder, which he adopted from the secular clergy, is a black Roman cassock with a black cincture. In addition, a badge with the emblem of the Congregation – the Return of the Prodigal Son – is worn on the upper left side of the habit.

Dedication to personal reform: Each member is required to undertake mental prayer and an examination of conscience twice a day.

Missionaries of Saint John the Baptist 
The "Missionaries of Saint John the Baptist" is a Public Association of the Faithful recognized in the Roman Catholic Diocese of Covington. It was founded by two former members of the Fathers of Mercy with the aim of establishing a new religious Institute of diocesan right which celebrates the liturgy according to the 1962 Roman Missal. The association operates Our Lady of Lourdes parish in Park Hills, Kentucky.

References

External links 
 Fathers of Mercy website
 Delaporte, Albert (1892). Vie du très révérend père Jean-Baptiste Rauzan fondateur et premier supérieur général de la Société des Missions de France, aujourd'hui Société des prêtres de la miséricorde sous le titre de l'immaculée-conception, fondateur de la congrégation des dames de Sainte-Clotilde. Paris.
 "Fathers of Mercy", Catholic Hierarchy
 "Fathers of Mercy breakdance for students at Catholic High School"

Catholic orders and societies
Religious organizations established in 1808
Catholic religious institutes established in the 19th century
1808 establishments in France